Columbus Day is a 2008 crime drama starring Val Kilmer, Marg Helgenberger and Wilmer Valderrama.

Plot
A thief has just one morning to fix the damage done during the biggest heist of his career, all while attempting to repair his relationship with his ex-wife.

Cast
Val Kilmer as John, the thief
Marg Helgenberger as Alice, his ex-wife
Wilmer Valderrama as Max, his longtime associate
Bobb'e J. Thompson as Antoine 
Ashley Johnson as Alana
Michael Muhney as Detective Daniels 
Shelley Malil as Babul 
Richard Edson as Manny
 Sean Blakemore as Officer Walters

References

External links

2009 crime drama films
2009 films
American crime drama films
2000s English-language films
2000s American films